Statistics of Austrian national league in the 1972–73 season.

Overview
It was contested by 16 teams, and FC Wacker Innsbruck won the championship.

League standings

Results

References
Austria - List of final tables (RSSSF)

Austrian Football Bundesliga seasons
Aust
1972–73 in Austrian football